Zhou Fang ( 200s–239), courtesy name Ziyu, was a Chinese military general and politician of the state of Eastern Wu during the Three Kingdoms period of China.

Life
Zhou Fang was from Yangxian County, Wu Commandery, which is around present-day Yixing, Jiangsu. He was known for being well-read and studious in his youth. When he reached the age of adulthood, he was nominated as a xiaolian (civil service candidate) to serve in the local commandery office. Around the time, one Peng Shi had rallied several supporters in Qiantang County and formed a bandit gang to terrorise the locals. Sun Quan, the warlord who ruled the territories in Jiangdong at the time, appointed Zhou Fang as the Chancellor (相; i.e. chief administrative officer) of Qiantang County to deal with Peng Shi. Within 10 days, Zhou Fang eliminated Peng Shi and the bandits, and was promoted to serve as the Commandant of the West District in Danyang Commandery.

In January or February 226, one Peng Qi started a rebellion in Poyang Commandery. Sun Quan appointed Zhou Fang as the Administrator of Poyang Commandery and tasked him and Hu Zong with putting down the rebellion. Zhou Fang and Hu Zong succeeded in their mission and captured Peng Qi alive and sent him as a captive to Sun Quan. For his efforts in quelling the revolt, Zhou Fang was promoted to Colonel of Illustrious Righteousness.

In 228, Zhou Fang became the central figure in the Battle of Shiting between Eastern Wu and its rival state Cao Wei. He pretended to surrender and defect to Cao Xiu, the Wei commander, who fell for his ruse and led some 100,000 troops to attack Wan County (皖縣; present-day Qianshan County, Anhui). Along the way, Wu forces led by Lu Xun and Zhou Fang ambushed Cao Xiu and his army and dealt them a crushing defeat with several thousands of casualties. In recognition of Zhou Fang's contributions in the battle, Sun Quan promoted him to Major-General and awarded him the title of a Secondary Marquis.

When bandit forces led by Dong Si raided Yuzhang and Linchuan commanderies, the Wu officers Wu Can and Tang Zi led 3,000 troops to attack them but could not breach their base. Zhou Fang came up with a plan by sending a spy to assassinate Dong Si, after which Dong Si's brother led the other bandits to willingly surrender to Wu forces.

Zhou Fang served as the Administrator of Poyang Commandery for about 13 years until his death (probably in early 239). During his tenure, he governed fairly and justly. His son, Zhou Chu, became a famous general during the Jin dynasty.

See also
 Lists of people of the Three Kingdoms

References

 Chen, Shou (3rd century). Records of the Three Kingdoms (Sanguozhi).
 Pei, Songzhi (5th century). Annotations to Records of the Three Kingdoms (Sanguozhi zhu).

Year of birth unknown
Year of death unknown
Eastern Wu generals
Eastern Wu politicians
Generals under Sun Quan
Han dynasty generals from Jiangsu
Han dynasty politicians from Jiangsu
People from Yixing
Political office-holders in Jiangxi
Politicians from Wuxi